Heze Mudan Airport is an airport serving the city of Heze in Shandong Province, China. It is located near Huangzhuang Village in Menghai Town, Dingtao District of Heze. The airport project received approval from the national government and the Central Military Commission in February 2017.

The airport opened on April 2, 2021.

Facilities
The airport has a  runway (class 4C), a  terminal building, and seven aircraft parking aprons. It is designed to serve 900,000 passengers and 6,500 tons of cargo annually by 2030.

Airlines and destinations

See also
List of airports in China
List of the busiest airports in China

References

Airports in Shandong
Heze